Jordan Millot (born 23 October 1990) is a French professional footballer who plays as a midfielder for Championnat National 2 club Moulins Yzeure. He previously played for Clermont, and made his senior debut on 4 February 2012, coming on as a substitute for Benjamin Morel in a 2–1 defeat to Châteauroux.

References
Jordan Millot profile at foot-national.com

1990 births
Living people
Sportspeople from Hyères
French footballers
Association football midfielders
Clermont Foot players
Moulins Yzeure Foot players
Ligue 2 players

Championnat National 3 players
Championnat National 2 players
Footballers from Provence-Alpes-Côte d'Azur